Darryl Norman Johnson (1938 – 24 June 2018) was an American politician and career Foreign Service Officer who held many positions in American government around the world.  Most recently and importantly he was the United States Ambassador to Thailand from  2001–2004. Additionally, he was acting US Ambassador to the Philippines for several months in 2005. He used to live near Seattle, WA. In retirement he was a lecturer at his undergraduate alma mater, the University of Washington, where he taught in its Jackson School of International Studies.

Early life 
Johnson was born in Chicago, Illinois, but he grew up in suburban Seattle, Washington. He attended public schools in Seattle, graduating from high school  in 1956. He then attended the University of Puget Sound for two years before transferring to the University of Washington, where he received his BA Cum Laude in English Literature in 1960.

While at the University of Washington he was a member of the academic honor societies for Military Science, Music and Literature, and was admitted to the Phi Beta Kappa Society in 1960. He next attended the University of Minnesota and Princeton University, working several months at the Boeing Company in Seattle during and after his university studies. He served as a Peace Corps volunteer in Thailand between1962 and 1965, joining the Foreign Service after he returned home.

Foreign service career 
Johnson had a long and distinguished career as a United States Foreign Service officer, with extensive experience in East European and Asian affairs. Among other assignments, he served on the Bosnia Task Force in Washington and as Charge of the U.S. Embassy in Sarajevo in April 1996. Before that, he was Senior Advisor to Madeleine Albright, U.S. Ambassador to the United Nations, and before that, was Deputy Coordinator for Assistance to the New Independent States of the Former Soviet Union.

Johnson served as the first American Ambassador to the Republic of Lithuania, having arrived in Vilnius in September, 1991, to open the first post-World War II U.S. Mission in that country. Prior to that, he served as Deputy Chief of Mission at the U.S. Embassy in Warsaw, Poland (1988–1991), and before that in Beijing (1984–1987), Moscow (1974–1977), Hong Kong (1969–1973), and Bombay (1966–1967). In addition, he served in the Department of State in Washington, D.C., as Officer-in-Charge of Yugoslav Affairs (1977–1979), Officer-in-Charge of People's Republic of China Affairs (1979–1981), as a Pearson Fellow in the Office of Senator Claiborne Pell (D-RI) (1981–82), and as Special Assistant to the Under Secretary for Political Affairs (1982–84). In the latter position, his responsibilities included East European, Soviet, and East Asian/Pacific Affairs during the tenure of the then Under Secretary, Lawrence Eagleburger.

Lecturing

In his capacity as lecturer at the University of Washington, Ambassador Johnson teaches a class called "Practicing American Foreign Policy", and also advises undergraduate students on their Qualifying Papers, an extended writing assignment of approximately 25 pages that is required by the Jackson School for graduation. This teaching position at the University of Washington has previously been held by former U.S. diplomats Ronald Woods and Charles T. Cross.   Ambassador Johnson also participates at various speaking engagements in the Seattle area, many of which relate to the Peace Corps and to the United States Foreign Service.  He has published op-eds in several major newspapers regarding politics in Thailand, including the Los Angeles Times and the Seattle Times.

Personal life 
Johnson is the father of one daughter and two sons. He is married to the former Kathleen Desa Forance. In addition to English he speaks Chinese (Mandarin), Polish, Russian, Thai and Lithuanian. Johnson died in Seattle on 24 June 2018.

References

External links
 Interview with Darryl Johnson at the Association for Diplomatic Studies and Training, Foreign Affairs Oral History Project (Association for Diplomatic Studies and Training, March 26, 2006)
 Discussion with Ambassador Johnson on events in Thailand and implications for U.S. policy toward Southeast Asia (The National Bureau of Asian Research, May 14, 2010)
 A Life Abroad: For Foreign Service Officers, the World is their Office (University of Washington Arts and Sciences Newsletter, Summer 2007)
An unclassified State Department diplomatic cable written by Ambassador Johnson from Thailand (U.S. Department of State)
 (video)
Text of a security agreement between Thailand and the United States that was agreed to during Ambassador Johnson's tenure (U.S. Department of State)

1938 births
2018 deaths
People from Chicago
Ambassadors of the United States to Thailand
Ambassadors of the United States to Lithuania
Directors of the American Institute in Taiwan
University of Washington College of Arts and Sciences alumni
University of Minnesota alumni
United States Foreign Service personnel
Peace Corps volunteers
20th-century American diplomats
21st-century American diplomats